Mark Andrew Greaves (born 22 January 1975) is an English former professional footballer who played as a defender. 

During his career he most notably played in the Football League for Hull City where he played from 1996 until 2002, he then joined Boston United during their time in professional football and managed to chalk up a combined total of 335 games for both teams. Greaves dropped in to Non-League football when he joined Burton Albion in 2007 and went on to feature for York City and Gainsborough Trinity before initially retiring with North Ferriby United in 2011. During the 2015–16 season he briefly came out of retirement and played for  Hull United.

Career

Hull City
Born in Kingston upon Hull, Humberside, Greaves started his career at Brigg Town, where he won an FA Vase winners medal before joining hometown club Hull City on 17 June 1996. He was named Hull's Player of the Year in the 1999–2000 season. He spent his whole Hull career playing in the Third Division and made 204 appearances and scored 12 goals in all competitions before being released in 2002.

Boston United
He was signed by Boston United caretaker manager Neil Thompson in August 2002. He signed a new two-year contract with the club in April 2004 and after this expired he agreed to a one-year deal in May 2006.

Burton Albion
He made 175 appearances and scored five goals in all competitions for the side before moving to Burton Albion in the Conference Premier in July 2007 after finishing the 2006–07 season as Boston's Player of the Year, which saw the team face two relegations. He made 46 appearances and scored five goals in the 2007–08 season but missed the play-offs due to a broken jaw.

York City
He was released after a season at Burton and joined fellow Conference Premier side York City on 14 May 2008. He was appointed as club captain for the 2008–09 season. His debut came in a 1–0 victory against Crawley Town and scored the only goal in the subsequent game against Wrexham. Greaves suffered from foodborne illness in September, which resulted in him losing 9 pounds, and missing York's match against Kidderminster Harriers. He scored a 94th-minute equaliser against Mansfield in the Conference League Cup third round on 4 November, which York eventually won 4–2 on a penalty shoot-out following a 1–1 draw after extra time. He started in the 2009 FA Trophy Final at Wembley Stadium on 9 May 2009, which York lost 2–0 to Stevenage Borough. Following the end of the season, during which he made 46 appearances and scored four goals, he entered negotiations with York over a new contract.

Gainsborough Trinity
Greaves was eventually released by York in June and signed for Conference North team Gainsborough Trinity on 7 July. He made 37 appearances and scored one goal in the 2009–10 season and he signed a new contract with the club in June 2010.

North Ferriby United

Greaves was among a number of players released by Gainsborough at the end of the 2010–11 season and on 28 June 2011 he signed for Northern Premier League Premier Division side North Ferriby United. In October, having made 11 appearances in all competitions for North Ferriby, Greaves announced his retirement as a footballer.

Hull United
On 30 January 2015, he returned to the game, joining Humber Premier League outfit Hull United.

Personal life
Greaves is the father of fellow footballer Jacob Greaves.

Career statistics

Honours
Brigg Town
FA Vase: 1995–96

Individual
Hull City Player of the Year: 1999–2000
Boton United Player of the Year: 2006–07

References

External links

1975 births
Living people
Footballers from Kingston upon Hull
English footballers
Association football defenders
Association football midfielders
Association football utility players
Brigg Town F.C. players
Hull City A.F.C. players
Boston United F.C. players
Burton Albion F.C. players
York City F.C. players
Gainsborough Trinity F.C. players
North Ferriby United A.F.C. players
Hull United A.F.C. players
English Football League players
National League (English football) players
Northern Premier League players